Of Grunge and Government: Let's Fix This Broken Democracy is a political non-fiction book written by rock musician Krist Novoselic, who was the bassist for Nirvana.  Published in September 2004, the book details how politicians need to return to grassroots movements and clean up politics in general.

In the book, Novoselic discusses how Nirvana emerged as the world's biggest band of the early 1990s, how he got involved in politics and why electoral reform is needed, in particular proportional representation and instant runoff voting.

References

2004 non-fiction books
Books about democracy
Books about politics of the United States